The 2019–20 North Carolina Tar Heels women's basketball team represented the University of North Carolina at Chapel Hill during the 2019–20 NCAA Division I women's basketball season. The Tar Heels, led by first year head coach Courtney Banghart, played their games at Carmichael Arena and were members of the Atlantic Coast Conference.

The Tar Heels finished the season 16–14 and 7–11 in ACC play to finish in a tie for eleventh place.  As the twelfth seed in the ACC tournament, they lost to Wake Forest in the First Round.  The NCAA tournament and WNIT were cancelled due to the COVID-19 outbreak.

Previous season
For the 2018–19 season, the Tar Heels finished 18–15 overall and 9–9 in ACC play which was eight place.  North Carolina was eliminated in the second round of the ACC tournament by Notre Dame.  They received an at-large bid to the NCAA women's tournament, which was their first trip since 2015. They lost in the first round to California.

On April 18, Sylvia Hatchell resigned after an external review confirmed reports that she had made racially insensitive comments and mismanaged players' medical issues. Hatchell, the only coach with national titles in the AIAW, NAIA, and NCAA, left Chapel Hill with 1,023 wins overall and 751 in 33 seasons with the Tar Heels, including the 1994 NCAA title. The school tabbed Princeton's Courtney Banghart as their new head coach on April 29, officially announcing her the next day.

Off-season

Recruiting Class

Source:

Roster

Schedule

Source

|-
!colspan=9 style="background:#56A0D3; color:#FFFFFF;"|Exhibition

|-
!colspan=9 style="background:#56A0D3; color:#FFFFFF;"| Non-conference regular season

|-
!colspan=9 style="background:#56A0D3; color:#FFFFFF;"| Conference regular season

|-
!colspan=9 style="background:#56A0D3;"| ACC Women's Tournament

Rankings

^Coaches did not release a Week 2 poll.

See also
2019–20 North Carolina Tar Heels men's basketball team

References

North Carolina Tar Heels women's basketball seasons
North Carolina
North Carolina women's basketball
North Carolina women's basketball